XHBN-FM is a radio station on 101.3 FM in Ciudad Delicias, Chihuahua. The station is owned by GRD Multimedia and carries a pop format known as Like 101.3.

History
XHBN began as XEBN-AM 1240, receiving its concession on January 16, 1952.

XEBN migrated to FM in 2011.

References

Radio stations in Chihuahua